The Nile Level Texts (or Nile Quay Texts) are inscribed on the cult terrace (the so-called "quay") at the temple of Karnak, in Thebes, Egypt. This cult terrace itself was constructed during the time of Ramesses II, but the kings of the 22nd to the 26th Dynasties recorded the height of the Nile on its western side. The inscriptions are invaluable records since they are dated to specific years of a certain king's reign. 

The cult terrace does not bear any inscriptions from the early years of reign of Taharqa, a period that is known from other sources to have been a time of drought.

The texts were first examined and recorded by Georges Legrain in 1896, and later recollated by Jürgen von Beckerath in 1953. Many are now damaged or lost through erosion.

References

Ancient Egyptian texts